Roland JX-8P is a 61-key, velocity- and aftertouch-sensitive, six-note polyphonic, fully analog synthesizer released by Roland in 1985. In a time of rising popularity of digital frequency modulation synthesizers, such as Yamaha DX7, JX-8P was marketed as the best of both worlds: while it was possible to create classic analog synth sounds, several new modulation parameters and redesigned hardware enabled it to produce certain types of sounds associated with FM synthesis, such as metallic percussive sounds. Likewise, traditional hands-on controls were replaced with a DX-style interface with membrane buttons and one "edit" slider.

The forerunners to the JX-8P were the JX-3P and the rack MKS-30. JX-8P was among the last true analog synthesizers produced by Roland in the 1980s, with Alpha Juno 1/2 synths, racks MKS-50 and MKS-70, and finally the JX-10.

Factory presets on the JX-8P were created by Eric Persing and Dan DeSouza.

Features and programming
Though the JX-8P is relatively complex, it may appear otherwise for its lack of traditional synthesizer controls. It features two DCOs per voice, two software-generated (and relatively soft) ADSR envelopes, high- and low-pass filters, two types of (fixed-rate) chorus effect, three different sync modes, etc. Additionally, it offers two "polyphonic" play modes, two "unison", and two "solo" modes, one of which stacks all its oscillators into a single monophonic sound. Further, the synth's MIDI specification is surprisingly polished for an instrument of this vintage (unlike most earlier Roland synths, and even its direct successor, JX-10).

Programming is achieved either by means of one "edit" slider and a table of parameters for selection by number input, or by means of a separate unit, the Roland PG-800 programmer. All parameters are available without the programmer, but editing with the data slider requires patience, and it is severely limited for live tweaking as only one control can be accessed at a time. The PG-800 provides dedicated slider controls for most parameters and fits comfortably onto the synthesizer. The PG-800 connects to the JX-8P via a dedicated port, with a proprietary 6-pin DIN cable. 
The programmer unit had to be purchased separately, and due to relative rarity, nowadays a second-hand PG-800 unit would ordinarily cost more than the synthesizer itself.

It is important to note, however, that most of its synthesis parameters can be accessed via system-exclusive (sysex) MIDI messages from a third-party hardware MIDI controller, or computer software over standard MIDI ports.

Memory
JX-8P's sound presets are organized into two banks, with 32 sounds each. Additionally, users can store 32 custom sounds in its internal memory, and 32 more in the optional M-16C cartridge. Patches can also be imported and exported via system-exclusive (sysex) MIDI messages. Patches are compatible with Roland JX-10 and MKS-70 synthesizers.

See also
Roland JX-10

References

External links
 JX-8P at Vintage Synth Explorer
 JX-8P factory patch mp3 demos at SynthMania
 JX-8P Test Report - GreatSynthesizers

JX-8P
Analog synthesizers
Polyphonic synthesizers